The 1966 Texas Tech Red Raiders football team represented Texas Technological College—now known as Texas Tech University—as a member of the Southwest Conference (SWC) during the 1966 NCAA University Division football season. In their sixth season under head coach J. T. King, the Red Raiders compiled a 4–6 record (2–5 against conference opponents), tied for sixth place in the SWC, and were outscored by opponents by a combined total of 216 to 181. The team's statistical leaders included John Scovell with 1,323 passing yards, Mike Leinert with 495 rushing yards, and Larry Gilbert with 767 receiving yards. The team played its home games at Clifford B. & Audrey Jones Stadium.

Schedule

References

Texas Tech
Texas Tech Red Raiders football seasons
Texas Tech Red Raiders football